Room Girl is the debut album by Japanese artist Meg, released on July 9, 2003. This album was released under Meg's then all-lowercase pseudonym "meg".

Room Girl peaked at number 87 on the Oricon weekly charts.

Track listing

Charts

References

2003 debut albums
Meg (singer) albums